The Suusamyr Botanical Reserve is located in the Suusamyr rural community, Jayyl District, Chüy Region, Kyrgyzstan. It was established in 1990 with a purpose of conservation of forests in flood-plains of the rivers Suusamyr and Batysh Karakol including willow, English elm, Prunus padus as well as Ribes janczewskii.

References

Chüy Region
Protected areas established in 1990
Botanical reserves in Kyrgyzstan